is a novel by Hiroko Oyamada. Originally published in 2014, it is Oyamada's second novel to be translated into English, after The Factory. Translated by David Boyd, an Assistant Professor of Japanese at the University of North Carolina at Charlotte, the novel was published in 2020 by New Directions. The first-person narrator, Asahi, a frustrated Japanese housewife, recounts the story featuring several overarching themes concerning strict gender roles of Japanese society.

Plot 
The novel begins with a phone call between Asahi's husband, Muneaki, and his mother, Tomiko. When Muneaki brings up his job transfer, Tomiko offers to let the couple live in the house adjacent to hers, rent free. After a brief discussion, they both agree that the offer is too good to pass up. A quick flashback recounts a dialogue between Asahi and one of her coworkers from the temporary job she quit due to her husband's transfer in which they discuss how little respect they receive as temporary employees. 

On the day of the move, Asahi notes that even though her new town is not that far away from her old one, it feels like an entirely different continent. Asahi's new life as a housewife is marked with boredom and a lack of mobility. Her husband requires the car for his work commute, and there is not much within walking distance besides the local supermarket. She comments on how time has lost its meaning for her. She opens the windows of her home and is overwhelmed by the sound of the cicadas. One afternoon, Asahi gets a call from her mother-in-law Tomiko asking her to deposit money at a nearby 7-Eleven. On her walk to the 7-Eleven, Asahi sees a large black animal which she follows off the path towards a river. Distracted by the sounds of shouting children, she falls in a hole which she is surprised to realize is exactly her size. Sera, Asahi's neighbor whom she had not met before this point, helps Asahi out of the hole and kills a bug that had latched onto Asahi's hand. When Asahi tries to introduce herself, Sera cuts her off, referring to Asahi as "the bride." They parts ways, and when Asahi finally reaches the 7-Eleven, she turns in the money and deposit slip only to realize Tomiko did not put enough money in the envelope, forcing Asahi to take out money at an ATM which is blocked by children. Later that day, Tomiko comes over to repay Asahi for the money she had to take out, but only gives her a fraction of the amount along with some popsicles. Later, when Asahi tries to talk to Muneaki about her encounter with the strange animal, he brushes her off.  

The next morning, Asahi sees the large black animal again. She chases after it, but it disappears around a corner, leading Asahi to Tomiko's backyard where she meets a man who claims to be Muneaki's brother. Asahi notes that he was never mentioned to her by any of his family members. The brother-in-law, who has apparently been living in the backyard shed for twenty years, gives Asahi new information about the black animal, including the fact that it is the creature responsible for digging the holes such as the one Asahi fell into. He is surprised to hear that Asahi has fallen into one of these holes and wants to see where she fell. Upon arriving at the riverbank, Asahi is surprised to see children playing. After having no luck finding the hole, the brother-in-law begins to play with the children as Asahi heads back home.  

Asahi and Muneaki spend the holiday of Obon with Asahi's parents before coming back home. Asahi wakes in the middle of the night to see Grandpa heading down the street. She quickly goes outside to follow him, meeting her brother-in-law along the way. They follow Grandpa to the riverbank where he falls into a hole. Asahi drops into a hole next to him. She finds the black animal at the bottom of her hole. Asahi and her brother-in-law have a personal conversation about his family when all of the sudden a bird plunges into the river. Asahi then escapes her hole and helps Grandpa out of his. They leave Asahi's brother-in-law as they head home. After leading Grandpa back inside, Asahi meets Tomiko and her husband who are quite surprised at what has happened. Asahi narrates that not long after this night, Grandpa died due to pneumonia.  

At Grandpa's funeral service, Asahi goes out back to check the shed for her brother-in-law, but he is nowhere to be found. After a meal, Asahi cleans the dishes and checks the shed one more time, but there is nothing but dust and jars of centipedes inside.  

The novel ends with Asahi getting a job at the 7-Eleven. After getting back home, she puts on her uniform in front of the mirror and looks at herself but only sees Tomiko looking back.

Main characters 
 Asahi "Asa" Matsuura, often referred to as "the bride" by the town's people, is the narrator and protagonist of the story. Her often confused perspective adds a substantial level of uncertainty to the events of the novel.
 Muneaki Matsuura is Asahi's husband. Often pictured reading from his phone, he is absent from most of the novel despite being the reason for the move that sets off the events of the story. Because of this, Muneaki is implied to be neglectful of his wife.
 Tomiko Matsuura is at first seen as a supportive and kind mother-in-law, but throughout the novel is proven to be a silently manipulative woman, using her proximity to Asahi's new home to maintain her control.
 Asahi's brother-in-law, referred to as "Sensei" by the town's children, is a self-described "hikikomori," or shut-in. Notably, he is never given a proper name, and no one else in the novel seems to mention him, leaving it to the reader whether he truly exists.
 "Grandpa", Tomiko's father, is silent throughout most of the novel. His midnight excursion from his home and subsequent death mark the climax and falling action of the novel respectively.
 Sera is Asahi's neighbor, whom she meets after falling into the hole in which the book is named after. She is the first character to refer to Asahi as "the bride." She is often described as wearing all white.

Themes 
There are many themes discussed throughout the book dealing with society's expectations of young people, especially women, in Japan.

Finances 
Finances are a recurring pressure described throughout the novel. Asahi's conversation with a coworker about the mistreatment of temporary workers is the first evidence of this, and it proves to be a consistent theme. The move to the countryside is made in large part because the family home they move into is rent free. Further, one of the first actions Asahi makes while in her new home is looking for local job openings in the area. She even feels bad for spending any money on air conditioning or entertainment in the new home because of her lack of a job.

Transformation 
The theme of transformation, or change, is noted both in the dramatic change in lifestyle that Asahi is forced to endure after the move and the shift in reality that is hinted at as possible hallucinations. Other symbols that hint at the underlying theme of transformation is the overwhelming influence of cicadas and the intense change in seasons after Asahi's move.

Gender 
The constraints of gender roles are a consistent theme of the novel. The men of society are rarely mentioned and when mentioned, rarely by their proper names, merely referenced by their familial relation. They are reduced to the "laborers" of the household, and women are left to tend to the house and children, if there are any. Asahi experiences this firsthand and is surprised when the people she meets in her new town refer to her only as "the bride."

Isolation 
The theme of isolation is recurrent throughout the novel, both in the physical location of Asahi's new home and the relationships between characters. Asahi makes few friends in her new life as a housewife, and her brother-in-law is a hikikomori who is neglected by everyone in the town, including his own family which never even speaks of his existence.

Alice in Wonderland Allusion 
The author closely parallels her characters with those of Alice in Wonderland, mentioning the book by name in the dialogue with Asahi's brother-in-law. Asahi plays the role of Alice with her brother-in-law being a self-declared white rabbit, although other interpretations compare him more to a mad hatter. Much like Carroll's novel, after the protagonist falls in the hole, the reader is left to decide which details of the story exist in reality and which are figments of the character's imagination.

Reception 
Many reviews praise Oyamada for her Kafkaesque and bizarre writing style. Lain Maloney of The Japan Times discusses how this writing style transforms a metaphor into something much more real. Another review, published by the Japanese magazine Metropolis, notes Oyamada's ability to create these mysteries with seemingly no clear ending as one of her greatest strengths.

Award 
In 2014, Oyamada received the 150th Akutagawa Prize, an award presented by the Society for the Promotion of Japanese Literature.

References 

2014 Japanese novels
Japanese novellas
Shinchosha books
Works originally published in Shinchō
Akutagawa Prize-winning works